Koshlakovo is a rural locality (a selo) in Shebekinsky District, Belgorod Oblast, Russia. The population was 682 as of 2010. There are 6 streets.

Geography 
Koshlakovo is located 15 km north of Shebekino (the district's administrative centre) by road. Pentsevo is the nearest rural locality.

References 

Rural localities in Shebekinsky District